Paradeudorix michelae is a butterfly in the family Lycaenidae. It is found in Africa.

References

Butterflies described in 2004
Deudorigini